The Final Countdown may refer to:

Film and Television 
 The Final Countdown (film), a 1980 science fiction film
 "Final Countdown" (Outlaw Star), a 1998 episode of the anime Outlaw Star
 Saraba Kamen Rider Den-O: Final Countdown, a 2008 Japanese film, the third film adaptation of Kamen Rider Den-O
 "The Final Countdown", a 2010 episode of The IT Crowd

Music
 The Final Countdown (album), a 1986 studio album by the Swedish rock band Europe
 "The Final Countdown" (song), the titular 1986 hit single from the aforementioned album

Other uses
 Final Countdown (video game), a 1990 action video game for the Amiga